Latin Rhythm Airplay is an airplay-only chart published weekly by Billboard that ranks the most popular songs being played on Hispanic rhythmic/hurban radio stations in the United States. The music typically heard on these stations include reggaeton, Hispanic R&B and hip hop, rhythmic pop/dance, and crossovers from English-language and/or bilingual acts. The chart was introduced the week of August 13, 2005, and came about as a result of radio stations tapping into the growing second and third generation Hispanic audience who wanted a Spanish-speaking or bilingual alternative to the (English-language mainstream, rhythmic, and R&B/hip-hop) formats that they felt would represent them. "Lo Que Pasó, Pasó" by Daddy Yankee was the first number-one song on the chart. With the issue dated January 8, 2011, the chart's methodology was change to reflect overall airplay of Latin rhythm music on Latin radio stations. Instead of ranking songs being played on Latin-rhythm stations, rankings are determined by the amount of airplay Latin rhythm songs receive on stations that play Latin music regardless of genre.

Only a few female artists have been able to reach the top ten of the chart. These include reggaetón singer Ivy Queen, who currently has seven top-ten, two of them number-one singles, Nina Sky, who appeared on Tony Touch's "Play That Song", Latin pop singers Shakira and RBD, and American R&B singers Beyoncé Knowles, Cassie, and Keyshia Cole. Ivy Queen became the first woman to top the chart in 2008, when her single "Dime" reached number one. Jennifer Lopez is the female artist with the most number-ones, with four. , "Danza Kuduro" by Don Omar featuring Lucenzo is the longest-leading song with 29 weeks at number-one.

Records

Artist with the most number-one hits

Artist with the most entries
(79) — Daddy Yankee
(51) — Wisin & Yandel
(45) — Don Omar
(37)  — Pitbull
(32) — R.K.M & Ken-Y

Year-end charts
2006: "Down" by R.K.M & Ken-Y
2007: "Sola" by Héctor el Father
2008: "Te Quiero" by Flex
2009: "Me Estás Tentando" by Wisin & Yandel
2010: "Dile al Amor" by Aventura
2011: "Danza Kuduro" by Don Omar and Lucenzo
2012: "Bailando Por El Mundo" by Juan Magan featuring Pitbull and El Cata
2013: "Limbo" by Daddy Yankee
2014: "6 AM" by J Balvin featuring Farruko
2015: "El Perdón" by Nicky Jam featuring Enrique Iglesias
2016: "Hasta el Amanecer by Nicky Jam"
2017: "Despacito" by Luis Fonsi and Daddy Yankee featuring Justin Bieber
2018: "X" by Nicky Jam featuring J Balvin
2019: "Con Calma" by Daddy Yankee featuring Snow
2020: "Tusa (song)" by Karol G featuring Nicki Minaj
2021: "Hawai (song)" by Maluma
2022: "Mamiii" by Becky G featuring Karol G

Decade-end charts
2000-2009: "Pam Pam" by Wisin & Yandel

References

External links
Current Billboard Latin Rhythm Airplay chart 

Hispanic American music
Billboard charts
Latin hip hop
Reggaeton